John Marsh Wilcox (1925 – October 14, 1983) was an American geophysicist. He worked at the University of California, Berkeley at the Space Sciences Laboratory from 1964 to 1971. He was an adjunct professor at Stanford University from 1971 until his death.

Wilcox received his Ph.D. at the University of California at Berkeley in 1954 under the supervision of Prof. Burton Jones Moyer. The title of his dissertation was
"A direct measurement of the nuclear internal momentum distributions of protons in light nuclei."

He died while swimming off the beach of Puerto Peñasco.

References

External links
Obituary by C. Stewart Gillmor

1925 births
1983 deaths
American geophysicists
Iowa State University alumni
University of California, Berkeley faculty
Scientists from the San Francisco Bay Area
Fellows of the American Physical Society
University of California, Berkeley alumni